The kong thom (Khmer: គងធំ) is Cambodian musical instrument, a hanging gong. The name may also refer to the kong von thom, a set of gong chimes arranged in a circular frame.

References

External links
Picture of Kong thom as a single gong
Band playing with a kong thom as part of percussion.
Picture of a Kong thom as a set of gong chimes

Cambodian musical instruments
Gongs
Asian percussion instruments